Bulgarian Premiere Futsal League is the premier futsal league in Bulgaria.

Champions

Teams for 2008/2009 season 
 FC Nadin
 FC Akademika
 FK G Sofia
 FSC Levski Sofia West
 MFC Varna
 FC Odesos
 FC MAG
 FC Vekta
 FC Mirineks
 FC Moni

External links
 www.futsalplanet.com

Futsal competitions in Bulgaria
Bulgaria
futsal
2002 establishments in Bulgaria
Sports leagues established in 2002